Ascanio Magnanini (active 1599–1621) was an Italian painter, active mainly in Modena. He was born in Fanano. He painted an altarpiece for San Silvestro Papa and San Francesco, Fanano.

References 

17th-century Italian painters
Italian male painters
Painters from Modena
Year of death unknown
Year of birth unknown